Mad City is a 1997 American thriller drama film directed by Costa-Gavras, written by Tom Matthews based on a story by Matthews and Eric Williams, and starring Dustin Hoffman and John Travolta, with a supporting cast featuring Mia Kirshner, Alan Alda, Blythe Danner, Ted Levine, Raymond J. Barry, and Larry King. This is Costa-Gavras' first English-language film since Music Box (1989). The title comes from a nickname of Madison, Wisconsin, where it originally was going to be set, and was used for its multiple meanings.

Plot
After being sacked from his job at a museum, former security guard Sam Baily returns to the place with a shotgun and dynamite and takes his former boss Mrs. Banks and a number of children (at the museum on a school field trip) as hostages. Local television journalist Max Brackett is in the museum using the restroom after an interview with the curator about financial difficulties. He becomes directly involved in the hostage situation, acting as Baily's intermediary to the outside world and the police.

Baily accidentally shoots a friend of his, Cliff, who's still working there as a security guard, sending him to the hospital. He later fires the weapon again, frightening the children and becoming increasingly unstable as he takes caffeine pills to stay awake. Along with the young intern coworker Laurie among the growing media circus outside, Brackett reports the inside story exclusively on television, reviving his career. By being free to come and go, he negotiates with a national network and its star news anchorman, Kevin Hollander, with whom Brackett has an unhappy history.

Baily wants the police to let him return home to his wife and kids, refusing to accept that he's going to jail. Brackett, on the other hand, makes a deal rather than let Hollander have the story, prompting Hollander to publicly accuse Brackett of prolonging the crisis and endangering the children. Laurie then betrays Brackett, proving that, like him, she's willing to do whatever it takes to further her own career.

When his friend Cliff dies, Baily starts to realize he's lost everything. Baily and Brackett allow the situation to worsen until the police finally have had enough, issuing a five-minute ultimatum to Baily for release of the hostages. Baily lets the children and Mrs. Banks go. He also sends out Brackett to try to convince the police to put down their guns so he could personally usher out Baily. But rather than face prison and his wife Baily locks the museum doors on Brackett, who's outside trying to get the police to listen.

Brackett tries to get him to come out, but Baily ignores him. Brackett is unaware that Baily has decided to set off his explosives, committing suicide. The blast knocks Brackett off his feet and into the parking lot, sending debris everywhere. As reporters surround Brackett to ask about Baily, all he can say is, "We killed him," referring to how the media handled the situation.

Cast
 John Travolta as Sam Baily
 Dustin Hoffman as Max Brackett
 Mia Kirshner as Laurie Callahan
 Alan Alda as Kevin Hollander
 Ted Levine as Chief Alvin Lemke
 Robert Prosky as Lou Potts
 Bill Nunn as Cliff Williams
 Kyla Pratt as Kid
 Lucinda Jenney as Jenny
 William Atherton as Dohlen
 Richard Portnow as Brackett's agent
 Raymond J. Barry as FBI Special Agent Dobbins
 Blythe Danner as Mrs. Banks
 Jay Leno as himself

Production
In April 1994, it was announced Universal had purchased a spec script titled Mad City written by Tom Matthews from a story co-authored by Matthews and Eric Williams. The script eventually went into turnaround where it wound up at Warner Bros.

Release

Box office
In the United States, Mad City opened at #6 at the box office with an opening weekend gross of $4.6 million. It went on to gross $10.5 million and when compared to its $50 million budget, Mad City was a box office bomb.

Critical reception
The film has a score of 36% on Rotten Tomatoes, based on 28 reviews; on Metacritic, the film had a score of 45 out of 100 (mixed or average) based on 23 reviews. Film critic Roger Ebert noted Mad City is inspired by the film Ace in the Hole and gave the movie two stars (out of four), writing: "The movie knows what it wants to do, but lacks the velocity for lift-off."

At the 1997 Stinkers Bad Movie Awards, Travolta was nominated for Worst Actor but lost to Tom Arnold for McHale's Navy.

See also
Gladbeck hostage crisis

References

External links

 
 
 
 

1997 films
1997 crime thriller films
1990s English-language films
1990s political thriller films
American crime thriller films
American political thriller films
Films about hostage takings
Films directed by Costa Gavras
Films produced by Arnold Kopelson
Films scored by Thomas Newman
Films set in museums
Films shot in Los Angeles
Films shot in New York City
Films shot in San Jose, California
Warner Bros. films
1990s American films